The Rachel Carson Prize (Rachel Carson-prisen) is an international environmental award, established in Stavanger, Norway in 1991 to commemorate the achievements of environmentalist Rachel Carson and to award efforts in her spirit. The prize is awarded to a woman who has distinguished herself in outstanding work for the environment in Norway or internationally.

The prize was established spontaneously during a 1989 meeting in Stavanger, on the initiative of speaker Berit Ås. The prize consists of money and the sculpture The Cormorant by artist Irma Bruun Hodne.

Awardees
 1991: Sidsel Mørck, Norwegian author and activist
 1993: Bergljot Børresen, Norwegian veterinarian
 1995: Anne Grieg, Norwegian psychiatrist
 1997: Berit Ås, Norwegian feminist and professor in social psychology 
 1999: Theo Colborn, American zoologist
 2001: Renate Künast, German Federal Minister of Consumer Protection, Food and Agriculture 
 2003: Åshild Dale, Norwegian farmer
 2005: Malin Falkenmark, Swedish professor in hydrology
 2007: Sheila Watt-Cloutier, Canadian Inuit climate activist
 2009: Marie-Monique Robin, French journalist
 2011: Marilyn Mehlmann, Swedish environmentalist and writer
 2013: Sam Fanshawe, British marine conservationist
 2015: Mozhgan Savabieasfahani, Iranian environmental toxicologist 
2016: Gabrielle Hecht
2017: Sylvia Earle
2019: Greta Thunberg, Swedish climate activist
2021: Maja Lunde, Norwegian author

See also 

 Women in science
 List of prizes, medals, and awards for women in science
 List of environmental awards

References

External links
Official website (English)

Environmental awards
Awards established in 1991
Norwegian awards
Science awards honoring women
Stavanger
Norway-related lists
Lists of women
Environment-related lists
1991 establishments in Norway
Prize